Gustav, 7th Prince of Sayn-Wittgenstein-Berleburg (Gustav Frederik Philip Richard; born 12 January 1969), is the eldest child and only son of Princess Benedikte of Denmark and Richard, 6th Prince of Sayn-Wittgenstein-Berleburg.

Biography
Prince Gustav is the head of the House of Sayn-Wittgenstein-Berleburg, the senior branch of the formerly princely house of Sayn. 
He resides at Schloss Berleburg-Wittgenstein in the town of Bad Berleburg, in North Rhine-Westphalia, Germany. He is the son of Prince Richard of Sayn-Wittgenstein-Berleburg and Princess Benedikte of Denmark and has two sisters, Princess Alexandra of Sayn-Wittgenstein-Berleburg and Princess Nathalie of Sayn-Wittgenstein-Berleburg.

The principality and princely title of Sayn-Wittgenstein-Berleburg descended, historically, according to semi-Salic primogeniture. If the childless Gustav dies without legitimate issue, the family heritage devolves upon his father's younger brother, Prince Robin zu Sayn-Wittgenstein-Berleburg.

Gustav was formerly engaged to be married to Elvire Pasté de Rochefort (granddaughter of French Ambassador André Rodocanachi and wife Nada Diplarakou, herself sister of Aliki Diplarakou and grand-aunt of Princess Sibilla of Luxembourg), with the engagement being announced on 16 August 2000 and wedding planned for 12 May 2001 in Paris. The wedding did not occur, reportedly due to financial issues with the bride's family, and it was announced on 16 July 2001 that they had separated. For many years, he resided with his partner, Carina Axelsson, although they were unable to marry due to a clause in Gustav's grandfather's will preventing him from inheriting family property if he marries someone not of Protestant, noble and Aryan descent. However, on 27 April 2022, the Danish court confirmed that Gustav would marry Axelsson on 3 June 2022, civilly and on 4 June 2022, religiously in Bad Berleburg.

He is the godfather of Count Richard von Pfeil und Klein-Ellguth, son of his sister Alexandra; Konstantin Johannsmann, son of his second sister Nathalie; and Prince Vincent of Denmark, son of his first cousin, the Crown Prince of Denmark.

Ancestry

References

External links

1969 births
People from Frankfurt
German princes
House of Sayn-Wittgenstein
Living people